"Overnight Sensation (Hit Record)" is a hit single by Raspberries, released in September 1974.  It was written by band leader Eric Carmen, who also provided the lead vocals. It was the first single release from their fourth and final LP, Starting Over.

The song reached the Top 40 on three principal US charts, number 18 on the Billboard Hot 100, number 24 on Cashbox, and number 26 on Record World. It was also a number 22 hit in Canada. It spent 12 weeks on Billboard, and was their final charting single release.

Cash Box called it a "simply incredible rocker (possibly the best ever laid down by the group)" and said that "Eric Carmen's lead vocals are perfect and dynamic as can be, but the real delight here is the series of changes this track goes through." Record World said that the song is in a Beach Boys mold and that the "dynamic production is in total command of goosebumps and a good time feeling."

John Lennon, a Raspberries fan, particularly liked "Overnight Sensation" and was present for part of the recording of the Starting Over album. Although uncredited, he is said to have assisted with the production of the song.

Later uses
"Overnight Sensation" was included on the Raspberries Pop Art Live CD set from their reunion concert recording, November 26, 2004, at the House of Blues in Cleveland, Ohio, released August 18, 2017.

Cover versions
In 1980, Cherie & Marie Currie recorded "Overnight Sensation". It was included on their album, Messin' with the Boys.

The Kevin McDermott Orchestra recorded "Overnight Sensation" for their 1994 album, "The Last Supper".

Chart performance

Weekly charts

Year-end charts

References

External links
 Lyrics of this song
  

1974 songs
1974 singles
Raspberries (band) songs
Rock ballads
Songs written by Eric Carmen
Capitol Records singles
Songs about music
Songs about radio